Four referendums were held in Switzerland in 1962. The first was held on 1 April on a popular initiative to ban nuclear weapons, and was rejected by 65% of voters. The second and third were held on 27 May on an amendment to the constitution regarding nature conservation and a federal law amending pay at the federal level. The constitutional amendment was approved, but the law on pay was rejected. The final referendum was held on 4 November on another constitutional amendment on the method of election of the National Council, and was approved by voters.

Results

April: Nuclear weapon ban

May: Constitutional amendment on nature conservation

May: Pay at the federal level

November: Constitutional amendment on the electoral system for the National Council

References

1962 referendums
1962 in Switzerland
Referendums in Switzerland